The 1962–63 FIBA European Champions Cup was the sixth season of the European top-tier level professional basketball club competition FIBA European Champions Cup (now called EuroLeague). It was won by CSKA Moscow, after they beat Real Madrid in a three-legged EuroLeague Finals, after the two first games ended with an aggregate two-legged tie. CSKA won the third and decisive game, by a score of 99–80, and thus won its second European Champions Cup.

Competition system
26 teams. European national domestic league champions, plus the then current FIBA European Champions Cup title holders only, playing in a tournament system. The finals were a two-game home-and-away aggregate.

First round

|}

*series decided over one game in Casablanca.

Second round

|}

Automatically qualified to the quarter finals
 Dinamo Tbilisi (title holder)

Quarterfinals

|}

*A tie-break was played in Madrid on 2 April 1963: Real Madrid – Honvéd 77–65.

Semifinals

|}

Finals

First leg Fiesta Alegre fronton;Attendance 5,000, 23 July 1963

Second leg Lenin Palace of Sports;Attendance 20,000, 31 July 1963

*Third leg Lenin Palace of Sports;Attendance 20,000, 1 August 1963, Moscow, Soviet Union

Awards

FIBA European Champions Cup Finals Top Scorer
 Emiliano Rodríguez ( Real Madrid)

References

External links
 1962–63 FIBA European Champions Cup
1962–63 FIBA European Champions Cup 
1962–63 FIBA European Champions Cup
Champions Cup 1962–63 Line-ups and Stats

FIBA
EuroLeague seasons